Ștefan Onisie (23 November 1925 – 7 July 1984) was a Romanian footballer and manager. He was a part of Steaua's Golden Team of the 1950s.

International career
Ștefan Onisie played six games at international level for Romania, making his debut in 1953 when coach Gheorghe Popescu I send him on the field at half-time to replace Titus Ozon in a 2–1 away victory against Bulgaria at the 1954 World Cup qualifiers in which he also appeared in a 1–0 loss against Czechoslovakia. In 1956, Onisie made his last appearance for the national team in a friendly which ended with a 2–0 away loss against Bulgaria.

Honours

Player
Steaua București
Romanian League (4): 1951, 1952, 1953, 1956
Romanian Cup (3): 1949, 1950, 1955

Manager
Steaua București
Romanian League (1): 1960–61

As assistant manager
Steaua București
Romanian League (2): 1959–60, 1967–68
Romanian Cup (5) 1965–66, 1967–68, 1968–69, 1969–70, 1970–71

Notes

References

External links
 
 

1925 births
1984 deaths
Romanian football managers
Romanian footballers
Romania international footballers
Liga I players
Liga II players
CS Minerul Lupeni players
Vagonul Arad players
FC Steaua București players
CS Minaur Baia Mare (football) managers
FC Steaua București managers
FC Steaua București assistant managers
FC Olimpia Satu Mare managers
FC Universitatea Cluj managers
CFR Cluj managers
Association football midfielders
People from Vulcan, Hunedoara